Wang Yuan; was a Chinese landscape painter during the Yuan Dynasty (1271–1368). His specific dates of birth and death are not known.

Wang was born in Qian Tang (钱塘, modern day Hangzhou in the Zhejiang province). His style name was 'Ruoshui' (若水) and his pseudonym was 'Danxuan' (澹轩). Wang imitated Guo Xi for landscapes, Huang Quan for bird-and-flower paintings, and Tang Ren for human figures. He trained under Zhao Mengfu with most of his works dating around 1340. He utilized a minute and brilliant style in all his works.

Notes

References
 Barnhart, R. M. et al. (1997). Three thousand years of Chinese painting. New Haven, Yale University Press. 
 Ci hai bian ji wei yuan hui (辞海编辑委员会）. Ci hai （辞海）. Shanghai: Shanghai ci shu chu ban she （上海辞书出版社）, 1979.

Yuan dynasty landscape painters
Year of death unknown
Artists from Hangzhou
Year of birth unknown
Painters from Zhejiang